Jars of Clay presents The Shelter is the tenth full-length studio album by rock band Jars of Clay, released October 5, 2010, through Gray Matters Records.

Overview
The Shelter is described as a collection of songs about community, the title of which was taken from the old Irish Proverb "It is in the shelter of each other that the people live." Shelter features appearances from 15 artists including Amy Grant, Derek Webb, Mac Powell, Leigh Nash, Sara Groves, David Crowder, Toby Mac, and Audrey Assad.

The album's lead single "Out of My Hands" was made available as a free download on the band's official website in August 2010.

CBN writes in their review of the album: "The ultimate strength of The Shelter lies not in its all-star cast or even stellar production. It's in the songwriting. Each and every song contains a penetrating spiritual truth that points the listener vertically toward worship. This might be Jars of Clay's best album since their Grammy winner, The Eleventh Hour."—CBN.com

Track listing

Credits
 Produced by Jars of Clay 
 Executive Producer: Terry Hemmings 
 A&R: Jordyn Thomas 
 Recorded at Sputnik Sound, Nashville, TN 
 Engineered by Mitch Dane, Assisted by Joshua Niles 
 Recorded at Gray Matters, Nashville, TN 
 Engineered by Mike Odmark 
 Amy Grant vox recorded by Mitch Dane (assisted by Drew Bollman) 
 Mac Powell vox recorded by Andy Hunt 
 Sara Groves vox recorded by Ben Gowell 
 Toby Mac vox recorded by Chris Stevens 
 Mixed by Jay Ruston 
 Mastered by Stephen Marsh, LA

All songs written by Jars of Clay except: 
 Out Of My Hands written by Jars of Clay, Gabe Ruschival, and Jeremy Lutito 
 Eyes Wide Open written by Jars of Clay and Phillip LaRue 
 Run In The Night written by Jars of Clay and Thad Cockrell 
 No Greater Love written by Jars of Clay, Laura Story, Gabe Ruschival, Jeremy Lutito and David Crowder 
 Lay It Down written by Sara Groves, Ben Gowell and Aaron Fabrini

Performed by Jars of Clay, with the following: 
 Gabe Ruschival played bass on We Will Follow, Out Of My Hands, Love Will Find Us, Shelter, Lay It Down, Call My Name, No Greater Love. 
 Jeremy Lutito played drums on We Will Follow, Out Of My Hands, Love Will Find Us, Shelter, Small Rebellions, Lay It Down, Call My Name, No Greater Love. 
 Jake Goss played drums on Eyes Wide Open, Run In the Night, Love Will Find Us. 
 Brother Henry played strings on We Will Follow. 
 BGVs on Shelter by Toby Mac and Audrey Assad 
 BGVs on Out Of My Hands by Leigh Nash
 Photography: Victor Huckabee 
 Grooming: Jordan Byers 
 Wardrobe: Talitha Sha Moak 
 Design: Tim Parker 
 Art Direction: Jars of Clay, Beth Lee, Tim Parker 
 A&R Production: Michelle Box

Awards

The album was nominated for two Dove Award: Pop/Contemporary Album of the Year and Praise & Worship Album of the Year, at the 42nd GMA Dove Awards.

References

External links
 Jars of Clay - Official Website

2010 albums
Jars of Clay albums
Essential Records (Christian) albums
Gray Matters albums